Burma is a rice-producing village on the Atlantic Ocean coast of Guyana, situated on the East Coast Demerara,  east of Georgetown.  The village is well known because it houses the Burma Rice Development Station, the only one of its kind in Guyana, where new varieties are tested for desirable traits. Work has been carried out on the breeding of additional blast resistant varieties of 'rustic' type rice as well as aromatic and salt tolerant varieties.  Burma is also the location of the Mahaicony-Abary Rice Development milling complex.  Both of the institutions are located two miles south of the East Coast Highway.

References

External links

Populated places in Mahaica-Berbice